Scea grandis is a moth of the family Notodontidae first described by Herbert Druce in 1900. It is found in South America, including and possibly limited to Colombia.

External links
Species page at Tree of Life Web Project

Notodontidae of South America
Moths described in 1900